Niokhor Dionge (born 15 February 1962) is a Senegalese judoka. He competed in the men's lightweight event at the 1980 Summer Olympics.

References

1962 births
Living people
Senegalese male judoka
Olympic judoka of Senegal
Judoka at the 1980 Summer Olympics
Place of birth missing (living people)